Iron Chef is a Japanese television cooking show produced by Fuji Television.

Iron Chef may also refer to:
Iron Chef America, American show produced by Food Network
Iron Chef: Quest for an Iron Legend, American show produced by Netflix
Iron Chef UK, British show originally broadcast on Channel 4
Iron Chef Australia, Australian show produced by Seven Network
Iron Chef Vietnam, Vietnamese show produced by Vietnam Television
Iron Chef Canada, Canadian show produced by Food Network Canada

See also